Stoic logic is the system of propositional logic developed by the Stoic philosophers in ancient Greece.

It was one of the two great systems of logic in the classical world. It was largely built and shaped by Chrysippus, the third head of the Stoic school in the 3rd-century BCE. Chrysippus's logic differed from Aristotle's term logic because it was based on the analysis of propositions rather than terms. The smallest unit in Stoic logic is an assertible (the Stoic equivalent of a proposition) which is the content of a statement such as "it is day". Assertibles have a truth-value such that they are only true or false depending on when it was expressed (e.g. the assertible "it is night" will only be true if it is true that it is night).  In contrast, Aristotelian propositions strongly affirm or deny a predicate of a subject and seek to have its truth validated or falsified independent of context. Compound assertibles can be built up from simple ones through the use of logical connectives. The resulting syllogistic was grounded on five basic indemonstrable arguments to which all other syllogisms were claimed to be reducible.

Towards the end of antiquity Stoic logic was neglected in favour of Aristotle's logic, and as a result the Stoic writings on logic did not survive, and the only accounts of it were incomplete reports by other writers. Knowledge about Stoic logic as a system was lost until the 20th century, when logicians familiar with the modern propositional calculus reappraised the ancient accounts of it.

Background

Stoicism is a school of philosophy which developed in the Hellenistic period around a generation after the time of Aristotle. The Stoics believed that the universe operated according to reason, i.e. by a God which is immersed in nature itself. Logic (logike) was the part of philosophy which examined reason (logos). To achieve a happy life—a life worth living—requires logical thought. The Stoics held that an understanding of ethics was impossible without logic. In the words of Inwood, the Stoics believed that:

Aristotle's term logic can be viewed as a logic of classification. It makes use of four logical terms "all", "some", "is/are", and "is/are not" and to that extent is fairly static. The Stoics needed a logic that examines choice and consequence. The Stoics therefore developed a logic of propositions which uses connectives such as "if ... then", "either ... or", and "not both". Such connectives are part of everyday reasoning. Socrates in the Dialogues of Plato often asks a fellow citizen if they believe a certain thing; when they agree, Socrates then proceeds to show how the consequences are logically false or absurd, inferring that the original belief must be wrong. Similar attempts at forensic reasoning must have been used in the law-courts, and they are a fundamental part of Greek mathematics. Aristotle himself was familiar with propositions, and his pupils Theophrastus and Eudemus had examined hypothetical syllogisms, but there was no attempt by the Peripatetic school to develop these ideas into a system of logic.

The Stoic tradition of logic originated in the 4th-century BCE in a different school of philosophy known as the Megarian school. It was two dialecticians of this school, Diodorus Cronus and his pupil Philo, who developed their own theories of modalities and of conditional propositions. The founder of Stoicism, Zeno of Citium, studied under the Megarians and he was said to have been a fellow pupil with Philo. However, the outstanding figure in the development of Stoic logic was Chrysippus of Soli (c. 279 – c. 206 BCE), the third head of the Stoic school. Chrysippus shaped much of Stoic logic as we know it creating a system of propositional logic. As a logician Chrysippus is sometimes said to rival Aristotle in stature. The logical writings by Chrysippus are, however, almost entirely lost, instead his system has to be reconstructed from the partial and incomplete accounts preserved in the works of later authors such as Sextus Empiricus, Diogenes Laërtius, and Galen.

Propositions
To the Stoics, logic was a wide field of knowledge which included the study of language, grammar, rhetoric and epistemology. However, all of these fields were interrelated, and the Stoics developed their logic (or "dialectic") within the context of their theory of language and epistemology.

Assertibles
The Stoics held that any meaningful utterance will involve three items: the sounds uttered; the thing which is referred to or described by the utterance; and an incorporeal item—the lektón (sayable)—that which is conveyed in the language. The lekton is not a statement but the content of a statement, and it corresponds to a complete utterance. A  can be something such as a question or a command, but Stoic logic operates on those  which are called "assertibles", described as a proposition which is either true or false and which affirms or denies. Examples of assertibles include "it is night", "it is raining this afternoon", and "no one is walking." The assertibles are truth-bearers. They can never be true and false at the same time (law of noncontradiction) and they must be at least true or false (law of excluded middle). The Stoics catalogued these simple assertibles according to whether they are affirmative or negative, and whether they are definite or indefinite (or both). The assertibles are much like modern propositions, however their truth value can change depending on when they are asserted. Thus an assertible such as "it is night" will only be true when it is night and not when it is day.

Compound assertibles
Simple assertibles can be connected to each other to form compound or non-simple assertibles. This is achieved through the use of logical connectives. Chrysippus seems to have been responsible for introducing the three main types of connectives: the conditional (if), conjunctive (and), and disjunctive (or). A typical conditional takes the form of "if p then q"; whereas a conjunction takes the form of "both p and q"; and a disjunction takes the form of "either p or q". The or they used is exclusive, unlike the inclusive or generally used in modern formal logic. These connectives are combined with the use of not for negation. Thus the conditional can take the following four forms:

If p, then q | If not p, then q | If p, then not q | If not p, then not q

Later Stoics added more connectives: the pseudo-conditional took the form of "since p then q"; and the causal assertible took the form of "because p then q". There was also a comparative (or dissertive): "more/less (likely) p than q".

Modality
Assertibles can also be distinguished by their modal properties—whether they are possible, impossible, necessary, or non-necessary. In this the Stoics were building on an earlier Megarian debate initiated by Diodorus Cronus. Diodorus had defined possibility in a way which seemed to adopt a form of fatalism. Diodorus defined possible as "that which either is or will be true". Thus there are no possibilities that are forever unrealised, whatever is possible is or one day will be true. His pupil Philo, rejecting this, defined possible as "that which is capable of being true by the proposition's own nature", thus a statement like "this piece of wood can burn" is possible, even if it spent its entire existence on the bottom of the ocean. Chrysippus, on the other hand, was a causal determinist: he thought that true causes inevitably give rise to their effects and that all things arise in this way. But he was not a logical determinist or fatalist: he wanted to distinguish between possible and necessary truths. Thus he took a middle position between Diodorus and Philo, combining elements of both their modal systems. Chrysippus's set of Stoic modal definitions was as follows:

Syllogistic

Arguments
In Stoic logic, an argument form contains two (or more) premises related to one another as cause and effect. A typical Stoic syllogism is:

If it is day, it is light;
It is day;
Therefore it is light.

It has a non-simple assertible for the first premise ("If it is day, it is light") and a simple assertible for second premises ("It is day"). The second premises doesn't always have to be simple but it will have fewer components than the first.

In more formal terms this type of syllogism is:

If p, then q;
p;
Therefore q.

As with Aristotle's term logic, Stoic logic also uses variables, but the values of the variables are propositions not terms. Chrysippus listed five basic argument forms, which he regarded as true beyond dispute. These five indemonstrable arguments are made up of conditional, disjunction, and negation conjunction connectives, and all other arguments are reducible to these five indemonstrable arguments.

There can be many variations of these five indemonstrable arguments. For example the assertibles in the premises can be more complex, and the following syllogism is a valid example of the second indemonstrable (modus tollens):

if both p and q, then r;
not r;
therefore not: both p and q

Similarly one can incorporate negation into these arguments. A valid example of the fourth indemonstrable (modus tollendo ponens or disjunctive syllogism) is:

either [not p] or q;
not [not p];
therefore q

which, incorporating the principle of double negation, is equivalent to:

either [not p] or q;
p;
therefore q

Analysis
Many arguments are not in the form of the five indemonstrables, and the task is to show how they can be reduced to one of the five types. A simple example of Stoic reduction is reported by Sextus Empiricus:
if both p and q, then r;
not r;
but also p;
Therefore not q

This can be reduced to two separate indemonstrable arguments of the second and third type:
if both p and q, then r;
not r;
therefore not: both p and q

not: both p and q
p;
therefore not q

The Stoics stated that complex syllogisms could be reduced to the indemonstrables through the use of four ground rules or themata. Of these four themata, only two have survived. One, the so-called first thema, was a rule of antilogism:

The other, the third thema, was a cut rule by which chain syllogisms could be reduced to simple syllogisms. The importance of these rules is not altogether clear. In the 2nd-century BCE Antipater of Tarsus is said to have introduced a simpler method involving the use of fewer themata, although few details survive concerning this. In any case, the themata cannot have been a necessary part of every analysis.

Paradoxes

In addition to describing which inferences are valid ones, part of a Stoic's logical training was the enumeration and refutation of false arguments, including the identification of paradoxes. A false argument could be one with a false premise or which is formally incorrect, however paradoxes represented a challenge to the basic logical notions of the Stoics such as truth or falsehood. One famous paradox, known as The Liar, asked "A man says he is lying; is what he says true or false?"—if the man says something true then it seems he is lying, but if he is lying then he is not saying something true, and so on. Chrysippus is known to have written several books on this paradox, although it is not known what solution he offered for it. Another paradox known as the Sorites or "Heap" asked "How many grains of wheat do you need before you get a heap?" It was said to challenge the idea of true or false by offering up the possibility of vagueness. The response of Chrysippus however was: "That doesn't harm me, for like a skilled driver I shall restrain my horses before I reach the edge ... In like manner I restrain myself in advance and stop replying to sophistical questions."

However, this mastery of logical puzzles, study of paradoxes, and dissection of arguments was not an end in itself, but rather its purpose was for the Stoics to cultivate their rational powers. Stoic logic was thus a method of self-discovery. Its aim was to enable ethical reflection, permit secure and confident arguing, and lead the pupil to truth. The end result would be thought that is consistent, clear and precise, and which exposes confusion, murkiness and inconsistency. Diogenes Laërtius gives a list of dialectical virtues, which were probably invented by Chrysippus:

Later reception
For around five hundred years Stoic logic was one of the two great systems of logic. The logic of Chrysippus was discussed alongside that of Aristotle, and it may well have been more prominent since Stoicism was the dominant philosophical school. From a modern perspective Aristotle's term logic and the Stoic logic of propositions appear complementary, but they were sometimes regarded as rival systems. In late antiquity the Stoic school fell into decline, and the last pagan philosophical school, the Neoplatonists, adopted Aristotle's logic for their own. Only elements of Stoic logic made their way into the logical writings of later commentators such as Boethius, transmitting confused parts of Stoic logic to the Middle Ages. Propositional logic was redeveloped by Peter Abelard in the 12th-century, but by the mid-15th-century the only logic which was being studied was a simplified version of Aristotle's. 

In the 18th-century Immanuel Kant declared that "since Aristotle ... logic has not been able to advance a single step, and is thus to all appearance a closed and complete body of doctrine." To 19th-century historians, who believed that Hellenistic philosophy represented a decline from that of Plato and Aristotle, Stoic logic was seen with contempt. Carl Prantl thought that Stoic logic was "dullness, triviality, and scholastic quibbling" and he welcomed the fact that the works of Chrysippus were no longer extant. Eduard Zeller remarked that "the whole contribution of the Stoics to the field of logic consists in their having clothed the logic of the Peripatetics with a new terminology."

Although developments in modern logic that parallel Stoic logic began in the middle of the 19th-century with the work of George Boole and Augustus De Morgan, Stoic logic itself was only reappraised in the 20th-century, beginning with the work of Polish logician Jan Łukasiewicz and Benson Mates.

Notes

a.  The minimum requirement for a conditional is that the consequent follows from the antecedent. The pseudo-conditional adds that the antecedent must also be true. The causal assertible adds an asymmetry rule such that if p is the cause/reason for q, then q cannot be the cause/reason for p. 
b.  "Stoic modal logic is not a logic of modal propositions (e.g., propositions of the type 'It is possible that it is day' ...) ... instead, their modal theory was about non-modalized propositions like 'It is day', insofar as they are possible, necessary, and so forth." 
c.  Most of these argument forms had already been discussed by Theophrastus, but: "It is plain that even if Theophrastus discussed (1)–(5), he did not anticipate Chrysippus' achievement. ... his Aristotelian approach to the study and organization of argument-forms would have given his discussion of mixed hypothetical syllogisms an utterly unStoical aspect." 
d.  These Latin names date from the Middle Ages. 
e.  For a brief summary of these themata see Susanne Bobzien's Ancient Logic article for the Stanford Encyclopedia of Philosophy. For a detailed (and technical) analysis of the themata, including a tentative reconstruction of the two lost ones, see

Citations

References

External links
 
 Stoic Logic (1953) by Benson Mates (1919–2009)

Classical logic
History of logic
Philosophical logic
Propositional calculus
Logic